North Herefordshire is a constituency represented in the House of Commons of the UK Parliament since its 2010 creation by Bill Wiggin, a Conservative.

Members of Parliament

Constituency profile
The seat has a substantially self-sufficient population, covered by civil parishes and with low rates of unemployment and social housing in each ward, with income levels concentrated towards the average in Britain.

Boundaries

This constituency contains a northern and central part of Herefordshire, including the towns of Bromyard, Kington, Ledbury and Leominster.

The constituency has the electoral wards:

Backbury, Bircher, Bringsty, Bromyard, Burghill, Holmer and Lyde, Castle, Credenhill, Frome, Golden Cross with Weobley, Hagley, Hampton Court, Hope End, Kington Town, Ledbury, Leominster North, Leominster South, Mortimer, Old Gore, Pembridge and Lyonshall with Titley, Sutton Walls, Upton, Wormsley Ridge.

The village of Weobley (listed above) was a former borough constituency that was abolished as a 'rotten borough' in 1832.

History
Parliament accepted the Boundary Commission's Fifth Periodic Review of Westminster constituencies which slightly altered this constituency for the 2010 general election to exclude those areas of the former county of Hereford and Worcester which are now in Worcestershire.  This meant North Herefordshire being at its core a successor to Leominster constituency.  The remainder of the county is covered by the Hereford and South Herefordshire seat.

Elections

Elections in the 2010s

See also
List of parliamentary constituencies in Herefordshire and Worcestershire

Notes

References

Parliamentary constituencies in the West Midlands (region)
Constituencies of the Parliament of the United Kingdom established in 2010
Politics of Herefordshire